Dahan is a Bangladeshi Bengali socio-political drama film written and directed by Raihan Rafi and produced by Abdul Aziz. It is distributed by Jaaz Multimedia. Starring Siam Ahmed, Puja Cherry, Zakia Bari Momo, and Fazlur Rahman Babu in the lead roles. Dahan loosely based on a true incident of metro city Dhaka. Music Directed By Rizvi Hasan.

Cast 
Siam Ahmed as Tula
Puja Cherry as Asha
Zakia Bari Momo as Journalist
Fazlur Rahman Babu as Leader
Sushoma Sarkar as Nurse
Tariq Anam Khan as Cameo Role
Raisul Islam Asad Cameo Role
Monira Mithu as Asha's Mother

Soundtrack

References

External links 
 

2018 films
Films scored by Akassh
Films scored by Imran Mahmudul
2010s Bengali-language films
Bengali-language Bangladeshi films
Bangladeshi drama films
2018 drama films
Jaaz Multimedia films
Films directed by Raihan Rafi